Chiatra is a commune in the former Haute-Corse department of France on the island of Corsica.

The commune contains the Alesani Reservoir, formed by damming the Alesani River.

Population

See also
Communes of the Haute-Corse department

References

Communes of Haute-Corse
Haute-Corse communes articles needing translation from French Wikipedia